Passandrina is a genus of beetles in the family Passandridae.

Species
 Passandrina egregia Reitter, 1878
 Passandrina striblingi Burckhardt & Slipinski

References

Passandridae